is a 1952 black-and-white Japanese film directed by Minoru Shibuya. It was entered into the 1953 Cannes Film Festival.

Cast
 Ryō Ikebe
 Isuzu Yamada
 So Yamamura
 Toshiko Kobayashi
 Yūko Mochizuki
 Shinsuke Ashida
 Yumi Takano
 Jun Tatara

References

External links

1952 films
1950s Japanese-language films
Japanese black-and-white films
Films directed by Minoru Shibuya
Japanese drama films
1952 drama films
1950s Japanese films